John Adamthwaite (24 June 1810 – 7 May 1870) was an English first-class cricketer from Manchester, Lancashire. Adamthwaite's batting style is unknown.

Adamthwaite made a single first-class appearance for Manchester against Yorkshire in 1845 at Moss Lane, Manchester. In a match which Yorkshire won by an innings and 67 runs, Adamthwaite was dismissed for a single run in Manchester's first-innings by Henry Sampson, while in their second-innings he was dismissed for a duck by John Ibbetson.

He died at Checkley, Staffordshire on 7 May 1870.

References

External links 
John Adamthwaite at ESPNcricinfo
John Adamthwaite at CricketArchive

1810 births
1870 deaths
Cricketers from Manchester
English cricketers
Manchester Cricket Club cricketers